Joanna Ruth Randerson  (born 1973) is a New Zealand writer, director and performer. She is the founder and artistic director of Barbarian Productions, a Wellington-based theatre production company.

Biography
Randerson was born in Auckland, New Zealand, in 1973 and moved to Wellington when she was four years old. She studied at Wellington Girls' College, and then went on to Victoria University of Wellington to major in English, theatre and film. She wrote, directed and performed in theatre productions for the Victoria University of Wellington Student Drama Club. At the same time she also wrote for and performed at BATS Theatre Wellington, and made television appearances as a stand-up comedian. After graduating, She co-founded the theatre group Trouble in 1995. In 2012 she finished her Master of Theatre Arts in directing from Toi Whakaari New Zealand Drama School and Victoria University of Wellington as well as participating in the Leadership New Zealand programme. Randerson was a recipient of the Arts Foundation of New Zealand New Generation Award in 2008.

Randerson's writing has been twice shortlisted for the IIML Prize (2006 and 2008), she has won Chapman Tripp Theatre Awards and was nominated for the Billy T Award in 2005. She has earned fellowships at home and abroad – she received the Robert Burns Fellowship in 2001 (Dunedin), Winston Churchill Fellow 2003 (Russia) and completed a CNZ/DOC Wild Creations Residency in 2002 at Cape Kidnappers'. Randerson won the Bruce Mason Playwriting Award in 1997 for her first play Fold (part of the Young and Hungry season at BATS).  She won the Arts Foundation of New Zealand New Generation Award for Literature in 2008. Her books The Keys To Hell, The Spit Children, Tales From the Netherworld and The Knot have all been critically acclaimed. Her work is characterized as dark social satire. In a review for The Keys to Hell in Landfall 209, Anna Smith wrote 

Randerson's world is a "holding tank" inside which we shriek, or remain terrified and mute witnesses to the despair that is life – a theme rehearsed over and over. Provocation, not subtlety, is the writer's special effect.

In the 2021 New Year Honours, Randerson was appointed an  Officer of the New Zealand Order of Merit, for services to the performing arts.

Publications
1998 The Knot (Wedge Press, 1998)
1999 "The Penguin People" in The Picnic Virgin, ed. Emily Perkins (Victoria University Press, 1999)
2000 The Spit Children (Victoria University Press, 2000)
2003 "Banging Cymbal, Clanging Gong" in Red Light Means Stop (The Women's Play Press, 2003)
2004 The Keys to Hell (Victoria University Press, 2004)
2004 Fold (The Play Press, 2004), published with "shudder" by Pip Hall
2006 "The Sheep, the Shepherd" in The Best New Zealand Fiction, Volume Three (Vintage, 2006)
2006 "Everything we Know" in Are Angels OK?: The Parallel Universes of New Zealand Writers and Scientists, ed. Paul Callaghan and Bill Manhire (Victoria University Press, 2006)
2009 Through the Door (illustrated by Seraphine Pick), Wedge Press
2010 The Unforgiven Harvest/ The Lead Wait (Playmarket, 2010)
2012 Tales From the Netherworld (Steele Roberts, 2012)

References

External links
 Official website

20th-century New Zealand dramatists and playwrights
New Zealand women dramatists and playwrights
20th-century New Zealand actresses
1973 births
Living people
People from Auckland
People educated at Wellington Girls' College
Victoria University of Wellington alumni
21st-century New Zealand dramatists and playwrights
20th-century New Zealand women writers
21st-century New Zealand women writers
21st-century New Zealand actresses
New Zealand stage actresses
Officers of the New Zealand Order of Merit
Toi Whakaari alumni